Since introducing its own currency in 1972 Malta has issued a number of commemorative coins. The Jean De La Valette commemorative coins issued in 2007 were the last commemorative coins to be denominated in the Maltese lira as Malta joined the eurozone on 1 January 2008. Most of the commemorative coins issued by Malta were struck in gold or silver and sometimes in Copper and Nickel alloys.

1972 Coinage
These were the first commemorative coins to be issued by Malta.

1972 Manwel Dimech Silver £M 1
1972 Fort St. Angelo (Forti Sant' Anġlu) Silver £M 2
1972 Hand-held Torch over map of Malta  Gold £M 5
1972 Maltese stone charcoal stove (Kenur) Gold £M 10
1972 Merill - Malta's National Bird Gold £M 20
1972 Neptune Statue (Nettunu) Gold £M 50

1973 Coinage
1973 Sir Temi Zammit Silver £M 1
1973 Mdina Gate (Bieb l-Imdina) Silver £M 2
1973 Senglea vedette (Gardjola) Gold £M 10
1973 Dolphin Fountain (Funtana tad-Dniefel) Gold £M 20
1973 Auberge de Castille (Berġa ta' Kastilja) Gold £M 50

1974 Coinage
1974 Francesco Giovanni Abela (Ġan Franġisk Abela) Silver £M 2
1974 Cottonera Gate (Bieb Kottoner) Silver £M 4
1974 Widnet il-Baħar Gold £M 10
1974 Gozo boat with lateen sails (Dgħajsa tal-Latini) Gold £M 20
1974 First Romano Maltese Coin Gold £M 50

1975 Coinage
The 1975 coins were minted twice, with different coats of arms on the reverse.
1975 Alfonso Maria Galea Silver £M 2
1975 St Agatha's Tower (Torri ta' Sant' Agata) at Qammiegħ Silver £M 4
1975 Maltese Falcon Gold £M 10
1975 The Fresh Water Crab (Qabru) Gold £M 20
1975 Ornamental Stone Balcony (Gallarija tal-Ġebel) Gold £M 50

1976 Coinage
1976 Ġużè Ellul Mercer Silver £M 2
1976 Fort Manoel Gate (Bieb il-Forti Manwel) Silver £M 4
1976 Swallow Tail Butterfly (Farfett tal-Fejġel) Gold £M 10
1976 Kanġu ta' Filfla Gold £M 20
1976 Ornamental Maltese door knocker (Ħabbata) Gold £M 50

1977 Coinage
1977 Kelb tal-Fenek Silver £M 1
1977 Luigi Preziosi Silver £M 2
1977 Xarolla Windmill (Il-Mitħna ta' Xarolla) at Żurrieq Silver £M 5
1977 Romano - Maltese Coin Gold £M 25
1977 L-Imnara : Maltese Lamp Gold £M 50
1977 Les Gavroches' Gold £M 100

1979 Coinage
1979 Foreign Military Facilities in Malta Silver £M 1

1981 Coinage
1981 First World Food Day (Jum Dinji tal-Ikel) Silver £M 2
1981 UN Children's Fund (Fonti tal-ĠM għat-Tfal) Silver £M 5

1983 Coinage
1983 Understanding Gold £M 100
1983 Architectural Barriers Silver £M 5

1984 Coinage
1984 First World Fisheries Conference Silver £M 5
1984 Wignacourt (1844), Tigre (1839), Providenza (1848), Strangier (1813) Silver £M 5
1984 Decade for Women Silver £M 5

1985 Coinage
1985 Malta - 1862 Silver £M 5
1985 Maria Dacoutros - 1902 Silver £M 5
1985 Tagliaferro - 1882 Silver £M 5
1985 L'Isle Adam - 1883 Silver £M 5

1986 Coinage
1986 Dwejra II - 1969 Silver Lm 5
1986 Knight of Malta - 1929 Silver Lm 5
1986 Saver - 1943 Silver Lm 5
1986 Valletta City - 1917  Silver Lm 5

1988 Coinage
1988 20th Anniversary CBM Silver Lm 5

1989 Coinage
1989 25th Anniversary of Malta's Independence Gold Lm 100
1989 25th Anniversary of Malta's Independence Silver Lm 2

1990 Coinage
1990 Visit to Malta Pope John Paul II Silver Lm 5
1990 EEC - Malta Association Agreement Silver Lm 5

1991 Coinage
1991 Save the Children Fund Silver Lm 5

1992 Coinage
1992 George Cross Silver Lm 5
1992 George Cross Gold Lm 25

1993 Coinage
1993 430 Years in Defence Christian Europe Gold Lm 25
1993 430 Years in Defence Christian Europe Silver Lm 5
1993 430 Years in Defence Christian Europe Cu Ni Lm 1
1993 25th Anniversary of CBM Silver Lm 5
1993 University of Malta Silver Lm 5
1993 World Cup 1994 Silver Lm 5

1994 Coinage
1994 Valletta Silver Lm 5

1995 Coinage
1995 UN 50th Anniversary Silver Lm 5

1996 Coinage
1996 Olympic Games Silver Lm 5

1997 Coinage
1997 UNICEF for the Children of the World Silver Lm 5

1998 Coinage
1998 30th Anniversary of CBM Silver Lm 5
1998 200th Anniversary Revolt Maltese vs French Silver Lm 5

1999 Coinage
1999 Mattia Preti Silver Lm 5

2000 Coinage
2000 Millennium Coin Silver Lm 5

2001 Coinage
2001 Enrico Mizzi Silver Lm 5

2002 Coinage
2002 Xprunara Gold Lm 10
2002 Nicolò Isouard Silver Lm 5

2003 Coinage
2003 Sir Adriano Dingli Silver Lm 5

2004 Coinage
Malta joined the European Union on 1 May 2004, to commemorate this, Malta issued a gold commemorative coin with a face value of Lm 25

2004 Malta's Accession to the European Union Gold Lm 25
2004 Giuseppe Calì Silver Lm 5

2006 Coinage
2006 Sir Temi Zammit Silver Lm 5

2007 Coinage
These were the last Maltese commemorative coins of the Maltese lira
2007 Jean De La Valette Silver Lm 5
2007 Jean De La Valette Gold Lm 25

Since 2008

References

External links
 The €uro Coins Collection Network

Malta
Coins of Malta
Malta history-related lists